Launcelot Rolleston (1737 – 25 August 1802) was a member of the Markeaton hunt.

Biography
Rolleston was born in 1737, the son of John Rolleston, the minister at Aston-on-Trent and Dorothy his wife. Rolleston's family seat was Watnall Hall in Nottinghamshire.

In 1762–3 Francis Noel Clarke Mundy commissioned a set of six portraits of his friends in the Markeaton Hunt and one of these was Rolleston. Each of the subjects was in the distinctive dress of the Markeaton Hunt, consisting of a blue coat over a scarlet waistcoat and yellow breeches. These paintings hung at Mundy's ancestral home, Markeaton Hall.

References

1737 births
1802 deaths
People from Aston-on-Trent
People from Derby